Belunki is a small village near Khadakewada in Kagal tehsil, Kolhapur district, Maharashtra, India. The population is around 600. It is situated on banks of the river Chikotra.

History
The village was established by two brothers, Sakhoji and Sultanji Patil, who obtained 85 acres of land from the British Raj. Over time they attracted residents and formed a village. Most of the villagers are farmers.

Facilities
The Balu Mama temple is newly constructed on the same site where there used to be a Maruti temple. There is one primary school for the first two grades.

References

Villages in Kolhapur district